Hinckley Rock is a rock  northwest of Gillies Rock in the northern Neptune Range of the Pensacola Mountains, Antarctica. It was mapped by the United States Geological Survey from surveys and U.S. Navy air photos, 1956–66, and was named by the Advisory Committee on Antarctic Names for Neil Hinckley, a member of the Electronic Test Unit in the Pensacola Mountains, 1957–58.

References

Rock formations of Queen Elizabeth Land